Ryszard Ochyra (born 1949) is a Polish bryologist. This botanist is denoted by the author abbreviation Ochyra when citing a botanical name.

In 1986, botanist Jiří Váňa and (mycologist) circumscribed Ochyraea, which is a genus of mosses in the family Amblystegiaceae and named in Rysard's honour.

References

Botanists with author abbreviations
1949 births
20th-century Polish botanists
Living people
Bryologists
21st-century Polish botanists